Javarri Latre Walker (born June 13, 2000), known professionally as Hotboii (often stylized as  or ), is an American rapper. His 2020 breakout single "Don't Need Time" has received over 75 million views on YouTube and spawned a remix featuring rapper Lil Baby. He is signed to Geffen Records, Interscope Records and Rebel Music, in conjunction with Hitmaker Music Group and 22 Entertainment.

Early life 
Javarri Latre Walker was born on June 13, 2000, in Orlando, Florida, growing up in the Pine Hills neighborhood on the westside as one of 17 siblings. He listened to artists such as Lil Wayne, Rich Homie Quan and Kodak Black. He began rapping at the age of seven and began releasing music in 2016 with the help of his mother, beginning by uploading music onto SoundCloud and YouTube.

Walker served two years in a juvenile detention program from 2016 to 2018 for breaking and entering. It was during this time that he decided to take his career more seriously, further developing his songwriting  while in juvenile detention.

Career 
Just before his incarceration, Walker had begun to receive some attention locally for his song "Switcharoo". After his release in 2018 he began to put out more singles, publishing his first music video that September for "Life of a Dog". In 2019 he released the single "YG's", a "detailed walk through [his] experiences and survival tactics in the street" that quickly gained traction. He began 2020 by securing features from Stunna 4 Vegas ("4PF Like Baby") and Rylo Rodriguez ("Sick of Cell") before releasing his breakout single "Don't Need Time" on April 27. Written in memory of his recently deceased friend Wolph, the piano-driven track was notably slower-paced and more self-reflective than his previous songs. In five months it accumulated more than nine million streams on Spotify and 24 million YouTube views on its music video, which was shot at Wolph's funeral. On August 25, a remix featuring Lil Baby was released along with a new music video that addressed the theme of police brutality following the killing of another one of Hotboii's friends, Salaythis Melvin, by an Orange County sheriff's deputy earlier that month. "Don't Need Time" was certified Gold by the Recording Industry Association of America (RIAA) in April 2021 and Platinum in July 2022.

Hotboii released his first mixtape, Kut Da Fan On, on May 22, 2020. It included previous hits such as "Don't Need Time", "YG's", and "Goat Talk", as well as features from Plies, LPB Poody, Rico Cartel and 438 Tok. Some of the songs were written during his time served in the juvenile detention program. Pitchfork noted how he "came into his own by polishing his blend of painful street tales and witty punchlines" on the project, while Audiomack called it "41 hyper-realistic and melodic minutes of contemporary hip-hop goodness." After releasing more music videos, he secured a feature from Polo G on "Goat Talk 2", a followup to the original which had by then become one of his most popular songs.

On December 11, 2020, he released his debut album Double O Baby with features from Lil Mosey, Toosii and Pooh Shiesty. Expanding on the theme from his last project, songs like "Police Brutality", "Malcolm X" and "Problems (No Rights)" addressed problems facing the African-American community in the context of the recent George Floyd protests and specifically his friend Salaythis Melvin's killing by police. Elevator Mag praised his "masterful flow and soul-baring storytelling" on the album. Later that month he performed on the Rolling Loud 'Home for the Holidaze' livestream headlined by Rick Ross.

Following the February 2021 release of "Fuck Shit", Hotboii returned on May 28 with the single and music video for "Nobody Special", featuring Future. Hotboii was scheduled to perform at Rolling Loud Miami from July 23 to 25, 2021.
Nobody Special is taken from his second studio album entitled Life of a Hotboii and released the following December 10.
The album features 42 Dugg, Moneybagg Yo, Lil Tjay, 438 Tok, Kodak Black, and Future.

On July 29, 2022, Hotboii released his third studio album Blinded By Death. The album features Lil Uzi Vert, Big30, and Kodak Black and was preceded by the singles WTF, Rich How I'm Diyn, Live Life Die Faster with Kodak Black, and Tell Me Bout It. Blinded By Death debuted at number eighty-nine on the Billboard 200, making it the first Hotboii album to hit the same chart.

Legal issues 
Walker was arrested on July 12, 2021 on charges of racketeering and conspiracy to commit racketeering. He was booked at the Orange County Sheriff's Office in Orlando and his bond was revoked.

Personal life 
Walker has a son. Walker has symptoms of ADHD.

Discography

Studio albums

Mixtapes

Singles

References

External links 
 

Living people
2000 births
African-American male rappers
Musicians from Orlando, Florida
Rappers from Florida
21st-century American rappers
21st-century American male musicians
21st-century African-American musicians
People charged with racketeering